Midwest Aviation was a commuter airline based first in New Ulm, Minnesota then in Marshall, Minnesota. From 1973 to 1977, the airline operated under the name Air New Ulm and from 1977 to 1979 under the name Lake State Airways. The airline operated from 1979 until 1983 under its final name, Midwest Aviation, before folding. 

At one point Midwest Aviation offered flights between Minneapolis and St. Paul. At the time it cost $5USD one-way and $10 round-trip to fly between the two adjacent cities.

Destinations 
Note that this list includes destinations of Midwest Aviation, Air New Ulm, and Lake State Airways.
Iowa
Dubuque (Dubuque Regional Airport)
Minnesota
Marshall (Southwest Minnesota Regional Airport)*
Bloomington (Minneapolis-St. Paul International Airport)
Minneapolis, Minnesota (Minneapolis-St. Paul International Airport)
New Ulm (New Ulm Municipal Airport)*
St. Paul (St. Paul Downtown Airport)*
South Dakota
Sioux Falls (Sioux Falls Regional Airport)
Those airports marked with an asterisk (*) are no longer served by scheduled airline service.

See also 
 List of defunct airlines of the United States

External links
TimeTableImages.com: Midwest Aviation

Defunct airlines of the United States
Defunct companies based in Minnesota
New Ulm, Minnesota
Airlines established in 1973
1973 establishments in Minnesota
1983 disestablishments in Minnesota
Airlines disestablished in 1983
Airlines based in Minnesota